Below is the discography by Brazilian singer Sophia Abrahão.

Albums

Studio albums

EPs

Singles

Other appearances

Music videos

References

External links
 Official Website

Pop music discographies
Discographies of Brazilian artists
Latin music discographies